Elias Warner Leavenworth (December 20, 1803 – November 25, 1887) was an American lawyer and politician.

Biography

He was born in Canaan, New York, and lived there before moving to Great Barrington, Massachusetts in 1806. He graduated from Yale College in 1824. He studied law at the Litchfield Law School from 1825 to 1827. He passed the bar exam in 1827 and practiced law in Syracuse, New York for 20 years until 1850, when he retired from the practice because of ill health.

Personal life

Leavenworth married the daughter of Joshua Forman, who was the founder of Syracuse, New York. His principal home, a mansion at 607 James Street in Syracuse, was a significant Greek Revival style structure where he received visitors of national and international stature.

Political life

In 1839, he was named supervisor of the old town of Salina, the first election at which the Democrats had been beaten for 15 years.

He was president of Syracuse village from 1839 to 1841 and from 1846 to 1847, and was mayor of the town in 1849, 1850, 1859, and 1860.

Leavenworth was a Whig member of the New York State Assembly (Onondaga Co., 3rd D.) in 1850 and 1857; and was Secretary of State of New York from 1854 to 1855. He was Chairman of the Republican State convention of 1860. In 1861 President Abraham Lincoln appointed Leavenworth the United States' commissioner for the convention with Granadine Confederation in 1861 and 1862.

Leavenworth was elected as a Republican to the Forty-fourth United States Congress, holding office from March 4, 1875 to March 3, 1877. He declined to be a candidate for renomination in 1876 and resumed business activities in Syracuse.

Syracuse parks

A resolution he introduced in 1888 procured Vanderbilt Square for the city of Syracuse. Additionally he persuaded the railroad to plant rows of trees on each side of the railroad from Beech Street to the heart of the city and install the first public sewer.

He was considered father of the park system of the city. Fayette Park was obtained through his efforts. About 1860, Leavenworth Park was named after him.

Later life

He died on November 25, 1887 in Syracuse, New York and was buried at the Oakwood Cemetery.

References

External links

1803 births
1887 deaths
Yale College alumni
Litchfield Law School alumni
Mayors of Syracuse, New York
New York (state) lawyers
Republican Party members of the New York State Assembly
Secretaries of State of New York (state)
Republican Party members of the United States House of Representatives from New York (state)
19th-century American politicians
Burials at Oakwood Cemetery (Syracuse, New York)
19th-century American lawyers